Sampursky District is an administrative and municipal district (raion), one of the twenty-three in Tambov Oblast, Russia. It is located in the south of the oblast. The district borders with Rasskazovsky District in the north, Rzhaksinsky District in the east, Zherdevsky District in the south, and with Znamensky District in the west. Its administrative center is the rural locality (a settlement) of Satinka. Population: 14,204 (2010 Census);  The population of Satinka accounts for 25.1% of the district's total population.

References

Sources

Districts of Tambov Oblast